Open Up may refer to:

Songs
"Open Up" (Cog song), 2003
"Open Up" (Leftfield song), 1993
"Open Up" (Mungo Jerry song), 1972
"Open Up (That's Enough)", by The Dead Weather from Dodge and Burn
"Open Up", by Chic from their album Real People
"Open Up", by DD Smash from their album The Optimist
"Open Up", by Dispatch from their album Who Are We Living For?
"Open Up", by Korn from their album See You on the Other Side
"Open Up", by Lamb from their album Between Darkness and Wonder
"Open Up", by The Saturdays from their album Wordshaker
"Open Up", by Chinese singer Shunza, 1999
"Open Up", by Daniel Caesar from his album Case Study 01

Other uses
OpenUP (Open Unified Process), an open source process framework
 Open Up, the slogan for Eurovision Song Contest 2021